Chapati also known as roti, safati, shabaati, phulka and (in the Maldives) roshi, is an unleavened flatbread originating from the Indian subcontinent.

It can also refer to:

Chapati Movement, initiative involved in the unusual distribution of thousands of chapatis across several Indian villages during 1857 carrying message of their native emperor seeking their services.
Miracle Chapati or Chapati Jesus, a chapati, or flat unleavened bread, roughly eight centimeters in diameter with, what believers claim, is an image of Christ miraculously burnt on it.